Lokesh (19 May 1947 – 14 October 2004) was an Indian actor who appeared in Kannada plays and films.

Lokesh made his film debut in the 1958 film Bhakta Prahlada. He had thrice won the Karnataka State Film Award for Best Actor during his career, for Bhootayyana Maga Ayyu (1974), for Parasangada Gendethimma (1978) and for Banker Margayya (1984).

Filmography 

{| class="wikitable"
|+
!Year
!Movie Name
!Language
!Notes
|-
|1958
|Bhakta Prahlada
|Kannada
|
|-
|1968
|Adda Daari
|Kannada
|
|-
|1974
|Kaadu
|Kannada
|
|-
|1974
|Bhootayyana Maga Ayyu
|Kannada
|
|-
|1975
|Ninagagi Nanu 
|Kannada
|
|-
|1975
|Devara Kannu 
|Kannada
|
|-
|1976
|Punardattha 
|Kannada
|
|-
|1976
|Parivarthane
|Kannada
|
|-
|1977
|Kakana Kote
|Kannada
|
|-
|1978
|Vamsha Jyothi
|Kannada
|
|-
|1978
|Nanna Prayaschittha
|Kannada
|
|-
|1978
|Suli'
|Kannada
|
|-
|1978
|Parasangada Gendethimma|Kannada
|
|-
|1979
|Adalu Badalu|Kannada
|
|-
|1979
|Bhoolokadalli Yamaraja|Kannada
|
|-
|1979
|Muyyi|Kannada
|
|-
|1979
|Kamala|Kannada
|
|-
|1979
|Daaha|Kannada
|
|-
|1979
|Chandanada Gombe|Kannada
|
|-
|1979
|Mallige Sampige|Kannada
|
|}

 Manini (1979)
 Bhaktha Siriyala (1980)
 Haddina Kannu (1980)
 Hunnimeya Rathriyalli (1980)
 Ellindalo Bandavaru (1980)
 Jari Bidda Jana (1980)
 Pattanakke Banda Pathniyaru (1980)
 Nari Swargakke Dari (1981)
 Sangeetha (1981)
 Yava Hoovu Yara Mudigo (1981)
 Avali Javali (1981)
 Bhoomige Banda Bhagavantha (1981)
 Yedeyuru Siddalingeshwara (1981)
 Rudri (1982)
 Archana (1982)
 Adrushtavantha (1982)
 Jimmy Gallu (1982)
 Betthale Seve (1982)
 Devara Theerpu (1983)
 Banker Margayya (1983)
 Ibbani Karagithu (1983)
 Karune Illada Kanoonu (1983)
 Onti Dhwani (1984)
 Hennina Sowbhagya (1984)
 Mooru Janma (1984)
 Shwetha Gulabi (1985)
 Savira Sullu (1985)
 Mavano Aliyano (1985)
 Shiva Kotta Sowbhagya (1985)
 Lancha Lancha Lancha (1986)
 Premaloka (1987)
 Sangrama (1987)
 Thayi Kotta Thali (1987)
 Surya (1987)
 Ranadheera (1988)
 Madhuri (1989)
 Sankranthi (1989)
 Kindari Jogi (1989)
 Aasegobba Meesegobba (1990)
 Anukoolakkobba Ganda (1990)
 Bhujangayyana Dashavathara (1991)
 Ramachaari (1991)
 Veerappan (1991)
 Hosamane Aliya (1991)
 Chaitrada Premanjali (1992)
 Ksheera Sagara (1992)
 Gopi Krishna (1992)
 Guru Brahma (1992)
 Baa Nanna Preethisu (1992)
 Bharjari Gandu (1992)
 Mavanige Takka Aliya (1992)
 Angaili Apsare (1993)
 Gundana Maduve (1993)
 Alimayya (1993)
 Shrungara Raja (1993)
 Bevu Bella (1993)
 Chinna Nee Naguthiru (1994)
 Lockup Death (1994)
 Yarigu Helbedi (1994)
 Mahashakthi Maye (1994)
 Poorna Sathya (1994)
 Panjarada Gili (1994)
 Putnanja (1995)
 Mojugara Sogasugara (1995)
 Madhura Maithri (1995)
 Sangeetha Sagara Ganayogi Panchakshara Gavai (1995)
 Putmalli (1995)
 Karpoorada Gombe (1996)
 Shiva Leele (1996)
 Sthree (1996)
 Ee Hrudaya Ninagagi (1997)
 Mavana Magalu (1997)
 Kodagina Kaveri (1997)
 Halliyadarenu Shiva (1997)
 Bhoomi Geetha (1997)
 Mungarina Minchu (1997)
 Prema Raga Haadu Gelathi (1997)
 Kurubana Rani (1998)
 Mr. Putsami (1998)
 Bhoomi Thayiya Chochchala Maga (1998)
 Preethsod Thappa (1998)
 Thayiya Runa (1998)
 Coolie Raja (1999)
 Patela (1999)
 Krishnarjuna (2000)
 Gatti Mela (2001)
 Nanna Preethiya Hudugi (2001)
 Rusthum (2001)
 Boothayyana Makkalu (2002)
 Ninne Preethisuve (2002)
 Punjabi House (2002)
 Nanjundi (2003)
 Shravana Sambhrama (2003)

 Awards 

 Karnataka State Film Awards 
 1973–74: Best Actor — Bhootayyana Maga Ayyu 1978–79: Best Actor — Parasangada Gendethimma 1983–84: Best Actor — Banker Margayya Filmfare Awards South 
 1974: Best Actor – Kannada — Bhootayyana Maga Ayyu 1980: Best Actor – Kannada — Ellindalo Bandavaru 1991: Best Director – Kannada — Bhujangayyana Dashavathara Aryabhata Film Awards 
 1997: Best Supporting actor — Mungarina Minchu''

References

External links 
 
Lokesh Filmography

1947 births
2004 deaths
Male actors in Kannada cinema
Indian male film actors
Indian male stage actors
20th-century Indian male actors
Male actors from Bangalore
Filmfare Awards South winners
21st-century Indian male actors